Proutista moesta is a species of planthopper in the family Derbidae. They are native to the tropics of Asia but have spread into other parts of the tropics. The species is known to feed on the sap of numerous plants include grasses, palms, and banana. Their sucking habit can make them vectors of plant viruses and phytoplasmas.

References

Derbidae
Insect pests of millets